The Harry Wade Exit Route was discovered and made by Harry Wade from Illinois in 1849. Harry Wade, his wife and children were in the Bennett-Arcan party caravan emigrating west. At the direction of guide Jefferson Hunt the caravan took a poorly planned turn and descended into Death Valley, California while looking for a shortcut off the Old Spanish Trail. The caravan of a 100 wagons were looking for the shortcut to get to the California Gold Rush sooner. Several in the group died while there, affording the valley its namesake. Harry Wade found a path out of the Valley, the trail he made is today called the Harry Wade Road, a dirt road. After departing Death Valley Wade found the Old Spanish Trail and came to Southern California though the Cajon Pass. Many in the party also suffered but nonetheless made it out of Death Valley. Harry Wade Exit Route was designated a California Historic Landmark (No.622) on October 9, 1957. A marker was placed about 30 miles north of Baker, California, on the Harry Wade Exit Route, to designate where his family escaped. The marker is at the southern end of Death Valley National Park.

Harry Wade was born on  March 16, 1800, in Rochester, England. He married Mary Reynolds Leach, who was born on June 17, 1813, in London, England. In 1836, he migrated to the United States and settled in Tioga County, Pennsylvania. After surviving the move to California they moved to Northern California and ran an inn called The American House in Alviso, California. He died on October 13, 1883, in Alviso. Mary died on May 3, 1889, in Alviso.

Death Valley '49ers

Harry Wade was part of what would become known as the Death Valley '49ers. This was a group of pioneers from the Eastern United States that endured a long and difficult journey during the late-1840s California Gold Rush to prospect in the Sutter's Fort area of the Central Valley and Sierra Nevada in California. Their route from Utah went through the Great Basin Desert in Nevada, and Death Valley and the Mojave Desert in Southern California, in attempting to reach the Gold Country.

Marker
The marker at the site (about 30 miles north of Baker) reads:

See also
Santa Fe And Salt Lake Trail Monument
Death Valley
Death Valley National Park
Geology of the Death Valley area
Places of interest in the Death Valley area
History of California through 1899
William L. Manly
John Haney Rogers
 History of San Bernardino, California
California Historical Landmarks in San Bernardino County, California

References

California Gold Rush
Death Valley
Death Valley National Park
History of Southern California
Mojave Desert